Ravinder Pandit (born 10 August 1959) is a former Indian cricketer who played first-class cricket for Jammu and Kashmir from 1978 to 1987.

Career

Pandit had one outstanding match, in the Ranji Trophy in 1986-87. Captaining Jammu and Kashmir against Services, he took 5 for 44 and 8 for 33 with his medium-paced bowling, and scored 158 opening the batting, to lead Jammu and Kashmir to a nine-wicket victory. His 8 for 33 is still the best innings bowling analysis for Jammu and Kashmir, and his 13 for 77 is still the best match analysis. In his second-last first-class match a year later, still captaining the team, he scored 30 and 119 to avert defeat in the match against Haryana.

In 2006 he was one of 23 former Jammu and Kashmir players to be included in a pension scheme run by the Board of Control for Cricket in India.

References

External links
 

1959 births
Living people
Jammu and Kashmir cricketers
Indian cricketers
People from Srinagar